The Committee on Conservation of Cultural Assets in Turkey is a province-based governmental committee responsible for the conservation of cultural heritage in Turkey.

History
In 1933, a department was founded within the Ministry of National Education for the conservation of the ruins of antiquity. After the establishment of the Ministry of Culture and Tourism in 1971, the department became an office of this new ministry. Following a series of name changes, finally in 2003, it was renamed "Cultural Assets and Museums Department". The Committees on Conservation of Cultural Assets are province-based subdivisions of this department at the ministry.

List of committees
Currently, there are 34 provincial committees:

References

2003 establishments in Turkey
1933 establishments in Turkey
Turkish culture
Committees
Conservation and restoration organizations
Historic preservation in Turkey
Government agencies established in 1933
Organizations established in 2003